The Canton of Guichen is a canton of France, in the Ille-et-Vilaine département, located in the southwest of the department. At the French canton reorganisation which came into effect in March 2015, the canton was expanded from 8 to 16 communes (2 of which merged into the new commune Val d'Anast).

It consists of the following communes: 
 
Baulon 
Bourg-des-Comptes
Bovel
Les Brulais
La Chapelle-Bouëxic
Comblessac
Goven
Guichen
Guignen
Lassy
Loutehel
Mernel
Saint-Séglin
Saint-Senoux
Val d'Anast

References

Cantons of Ille-et-Vilaine